Orlando Palacios (born 16 March 1954) is a Cuban boxer. He competed in the men's featherweight event at the 1972 Summer Olympics. At the 1972 Summer Olympics, he defeated Joe Cofie of Ghana, before losing to Gabriel Pometcu of Romania.

References

1954 births
Living people
Cuban male boxers
Olympic boxers of Cuba
Boxers at the 1972 Summer Olympics
Place of birth missing (living people)
Featherweight boxers
20th-century Cuban people